The Miss Lebanon 2022 beauty pageant was held on July 24, 2022. Maya Reaidy crowned her successor Yasmina Zaytoun at the end of the event.

It was announced during the live presentation by Rima Fakih the National Director of Miss Universe Lebanon that the winner of the pageant will represent Lebanon at Miss Universe 2022 and Miss World 2022.

Members of the Miss World organization was present at the event, including CEO and chairperson Julia Morley, Stephen Douglas Morley, Miss World 2021 Karolina Bielawska, her first runner-up, Miss World Americas 2021 and Beauty With A Purpose Ambassador Shree Saini, second runner-up and Miss World Africa 2021 Olivia Yacé, and Miss World 2019 Toni-Ann Singh.

Results

Placements

Contestants

Judges
Michel Fadel – Composer
Karen Wazen – Influencer
Mohamad Yehya – General manager, IP Studios
Karolina Bielawska – Miss World 2021 from Poland
Julia Morley – Chairwoman and CEO of the Miss World Organization (Took over from Karolina Bielawska after feeling unwell)
Nayla Tueni – An-Nahar general manager
Ivan Caracalla – Caracalla theater director
Hilda Khalife – TV host
Samaya Chedrawi – Miss Universe Lebanon 1993

References

External links
 

Miss Lebanon
2022 in Lebanon
Lebanon